BLRC may refer to:
British League of Racing Cyclists
Burnaby Lake Rugby Club
British League Riders' Championship, UK motorcycle speedway championship staged between 1965 and 1994